Mr Palfrey of Westminster is a British television drama produced by Thames Television for ITV which ran between 18 April 1984 and 11 June 1985.

Plot summary
Mr Palfrey is a mild, middle-aged man—the epitome of a middle-ranking British Civil Servant. He is also a spook.

Two series in total were made in addition to the pilot. The pilot, "The Traitor", by George Markstein, aired as part of Thames Television's Storyboard anthology on 23 August 1983. Series 1 consisted of four one-hour episodes, and first aired on Wednesday evenings from 9.00 to 10.00pm, 18 April to 9 May 1984. Series 2 consisted of six one-hour episodes and aired on Tuesdays, again from 9.00 to 10.00pm, 7 May to 11 June 1985. A subsequent play featuring Blair, "A Question of Commitment", by Philip Broadley, was first transmitted in the Storyboard anthology on 23 May 1989.

Regular cast and characters
Alec McCowen as Mr Palfrey, the lead character, a Whitehall-based spycatcher
Briony McRoberts as Caroline, Mr Palfrey's secretary
Clive Wood as Blair, Mr Palfrey's more action-orientated assistant
Caroline Blakiston as Co-Ordinator, head of espionage activities for the British Government

Episode list

Series 1 (1984)

Series 2 (1985)

DVD release
The complete series, including the pilot episode ("The Traitor") and the 'postscript' play transmitted in 1989 and featuring Clive Wood as Blair, was released on a 3-DVD set by Network Distributing Ltd. on 16 August 2010.

Notes

External links
 

1984 British television series debuts
1985 British television series endings
1980s British drama television series
ITV television dramas
English-language television shows
Television series by Fremantle (company)
Television shows produced by Thames Television
Television shows set in London